Weekend Playhouse is a one-hour UK television anthology drama series produced by London Weekend Television (LWT) and airing on ITV (TV network) in 1984.  There were seven episodes.

Guest stars included Bob Hoskins, Michael Kitchen, and Brenda Blethyn.

External links

British drama television series
1984 British television series debuts
1984 British television series endings
London Weekend Television shows
1980s British drama television series